The MA Aziz Stadium (also known as Chittagong Stadium) is a multi-purpose stadium in Chittagong, Bangladesh. The local cricket and football teams play there and it is sometimes used by the Bangladesh national football team. Its total capacity is 30,000. On a historical note, this stadium was used as headquarters during the war for independence in 1971. The stadium serves as the main football venue of Chittagong as main cricket venue of the port city has been shifted to the Zohur Ahmed Chowdhury Stadium. It is the home venue of Chittagong Abahani in Bangladesh Premier League (football). Since 2015, the stadium is hosting Sheikh Kamal International Club Cup, country’s only international club football tournament organised by Chittagong Abahani.

History
On 1 January 1955 Indian team led by Vinoo Mankad came to play in the newly built stadium. Their opponents were East Pakistan Sports Federation. Then the stadium was called Niaz Stadium, after the name of District Administrator of that time who helped to build it. Then the
name of the mountain covered aria was Jongli Polton. Later it was changed. After the Mankad's team the stadium welcomed Donald Carr of MCC. MCC also came once more after the war of liberation. In 1976–77 the name of the stadium was changed to Chattagram Jilla Krira Porishod (Chittagong District Sports Organization) stadium. It was under the PG of that district.

The stadium became the centre of Chittagong's sports over the years. In 1957–58 Chittagong Commerce College met Jogonnath College at the final of the Inter College Cricket. Chittagong team was runners up. At the outer part of the stadium Star Jubo and Star Summer tournaments were also held. East Bengal also came to play. In the 1980s cricket started to be influenced by Asgar, Abedin and Ispahani family. Many of the National Team cricketers like Minhajul Abedin, Akram Khan, Shaheedur Rahman and Nurul Abedin started their careers here. Later tournaments like Star Jubo and Star Summer had stopped.

The first One Day International (ODI) took place back on 27 October 1988 during the 1988 Asia Cup. Bangladesh's opponent was India and Pakistan in those two matches. Bangladesh lost the matches by 9 wickets and 173 runs respectively. Bangladesh played 7 Tests and 8 ODIs so far at this ground. The stadium made a debut as the 82nd test venue on 15 November 2001 with the Test match between Bangladesh and Zimbabwe.

The venue has also hosted group stage matches of 2004 and 2016 Under-19 Cricket World Cup matches.

The stadium is the main football venue of port city, it hosted matches during the 2006 AFC Challenge Cup and is also a regulars venue for the Chittagong Football League.

Stats and records
The venue has hosted
 Test Matches – 8
 One Day International – 10
 T20I – 0
 The venue hosted 1st ever International ODI match in Bangladesh in 1988. The match was between Bangladesh vs India.
 The venue became only 2nd test venue in Bangladesh in 2005. The first being Bangabandhu National Stadium.
 In January 2005, when Zimbabwe national cricket team toured to Bangladesh, In the first test Bangladesh won their first ever test match in their 35 test match at this venue. Bangladesh defeated Zimbabwe by 226 runs.

BPL 2013

After a long time the M. A. Aziz Stadium hosted cricket matches of the second edition of Bangladesh Premier League, along with Sher-e-Bangla Stadium in Dhaka and Sheikh Abu Naser Stadium in Khulna. Home team Chittagong Kings played 4 matches here. 10 matches were played from 25 January to 2 February 2013.

Outer Stadium
Immediately east of MA Aziz Stadium lies Outer Stadium. Owned by the Bangladesh Army, it is on a 99-year lease to the Chittagong District Sports Association (Chattagram Jila Krira Sangstha or CJKS). By 2012, Outer Stadium was almost never being used for sports, instead being used to host various fairs. The Chattogram Zila Krira Sangstha Swimming Complex opened in 2019 on one acre of the site. In 2020, only one corner of the remaining ground could be used for batting and bowling practice. The rest of the field was described by bdnews24.com as an overgrown, waterlogged dump, "unusable for sports" because of chronic neglect and lack of maintenance.

See also
 Stadiums in Bangladesh
 List of football stadiums in Bangladesh
 List of international cricket grounds in Bangladesh

References

External links

 Stadium Profile CricketArchive

Football venues in Bangladesh
Cricket grounds in Bangladesh
Test cricket grounds in Bangladesh
Sport in Chittagong